Amethi is a town and a nagar panchayat in the Lucknow district in the Indian state of Uttar Pradesh.

Geography

Demographics
 India census, Amethi had a population of 11,366. Males constitute 53% of the population and females 47%. Amethi has an average literacy rate of 75%. In Amethi, 18% of the population is under 6 years of age.

References

Cities and towns in Lucknow district